Albert Antonio Serge Garant,  (September 22, 1929 – November 1, 1986) was a Canadian composer, conductor, music critic, professor of music at the University of Montreal and radio host of Musique de notre siècle on Radio-Canada. In 1966, he with Jean Papineau-Couture, Maryvonne Kendergi, Wilfrid Pelletier and Hugh Davidson co-founded the Société de musique contemporaine du Québec. In 1979, he was made an Officer of the Order of Canada. The Prix Serge-Garant was created in his honor by the Fondation Émile Nelligan. Among his notable pupils were Ginette Bellavance, Walter Boudreau, Marcelle Deschênes, Denis Gougeon, Richard Grégoire, Anne Lauber, Michel Longtin, Myke Roy, and François Tousignant.

Early life 

Serge had a very early musical initiation, through culture and interest for music from his mother. He attended the Sacred Heart of Jesus Elementary School in Quebec City, where he spent three consecutive years (1936–1939). Upset by the events of the economic crisis from 1929 to 1939, the Garant family moved successively from Quebec to L'Ancienne-Lorette in 1940, and L'Ancienne -Lorette to Verdun in 1941, and eventually settled in Sherbrooke in 1941. Continuing his academic learning over these moves, Serge Garant finished his ninth year at St. John the Baptist school Sherbrooke in 1945. During his studies, Garant developed a particular interest in the clarinet, one of several instruments that he came to master over his life. In 1946, Garant, who displayed a flair for wind instruments, learned saxophone by himself.

Exploring many aspects of the music industry, Garant decided to turn to the piano, where he was first under the supervision of one of the founders of the Symphony Orchestra of Sherbrooke, Sylvio Lacharité. Lacharité initiated Garant to the grandiose nature of literature and its inherent link with music, a legacy that greatly influenced his writings and compositions throughout his career. Enjoying a stay in the school orchestra Pierre Monteux through his contact with Lacharité, Garant took interests in writing music. In 1946, he wrote Conte (version for strings, flute and clarinet), a work which he presented at the Youth Festival in 1949. Thereafter, Garant, while continuing to practice and write music for the saxophone and clarinet, continued his piano studies in Montreal with Yvonne Hubert. In 1951, having learned the basics of music theory and widely explored the practical field experience as an interpreter and maestro, Garant set sail for the French capital. In Paris, Serge Garant followed lessons of Andree Vaurabourg-Honegger and Messiaen.

Professor 

The first experience of teaching for Serge Garant probably went back to the summer of 1951, when he was invited to participate in the camp musical Knowlton. But it was not until 1967 that Garant was invited by the Dean of the Faculty of Music of the University of Montreal to teach the twentieth century composition analysis class. Garant was granted tenure in 1971.

As part of his academic musical education, Garant found particularly difficult the task to evaluate the work of his students. He wanted to be as objective as possible and not judge their compositions according to his own values, but rather in terms of what students wanted to do and what they did. These comments are supported by a student who attended his classes: "You could come up with any crazy idea, [...] Read in any style, as long as we knew what we wanted. "

In 1986, Garant ended his teaching duties, weakened by illness and exhausted to teach. However, Garant communicated by telephone from the hospital to assign grades to his students through another professor of music from the University of Montreal.

Radio host 

Serge Garant participated in several radio programs as an expert, but his career as a host itself to CBC began in 1955 with Do-Mi-Sol, and continued through Sur nos ondes (1957–1958) and Musique de notre siècle (1969–1985). The latter radio program was for him an extraordinary means of diffusion allowing him to hear and comment on works, among others, belonging to the serial and electroacoustic music. In addition to his writing in specialized periodicals and in some newspapers, speaking at a radio program was for Garant an extension of his work in pedagogy. It was a way to put forward modern music too, a style that he defended tooth and nail until the very end of his life.

According to Garant, musical work of the early twentieth century was to be classified as "classic", in contrast to the more recent works of his contemporaries he defended tirelessly. He refused to settle in the ease and comfort of a predictable intellectual and lived music.

Garant considered the actual transformation of contemporary musical language, focusing on instrumentation, orchestration and all electro technological methods now available to modern composers. Contextualizing his thoughts through comparisons with easily identifiable landmark works, as far back as Bach, he gave his listeners musicologically meaningful benchmarks.

Among the many styles of modern music, Serge Garant clearly identified himself as a "serial music" composer. He tried to explain to his audience the nature of this new musical language that swept all the old conventions of sound reference acquired in previous centuries.

He admitted the difficulty of approaching this new music, but passionately explored the renewed world of music with new musical origins. As an objective teacher, he described and analyzed some critical composers he considered dissidents, staying on position very encamped against them. In this sense, he admitted to being baffled by composing techniques and composers who created works with atypical structures that may seem sealed and inaccessible to those who refuse to supply a substantial intellectual contribution to the understand this modern music.

Distinctions 

1971 – Canada Council of Music Medal
1979 – Prix Calixa-Lavallée from the Société Saint-Jean-Baptiste in Montréal
1979 – Officer of the Order of Canada
1980 – Prix Jules-Léger for new music
1984 – The Canada Council for the Arts music prize
1986 – Member of the Royal Society of Canada

Selected works 

Concerts sur terre
Caprices
Nucléogame
Trois pièces pour quatuor à cordes
Musique pour la mort d'un poète
Ouranos

See also 

 Music of Canada
 List of Canadian composers

Notes

External links 
Serge Garant at the Canadian Music Centre

1929 births
1986 deaths
Canadian male composers
Jules Léger Prize for New Chamber Music winners
Canadian classical composers
Officers of the Order of Canada
20th-century Canadian composers
Fellows of the Royal Society of Canada
20th-century Canadian male musicians